Shek Kiu Tau is a village in the Sha Tau Kok area of North District of Hong Kong.

Administration
Shek Kiu Tau is a recognized village under the New Territories Small House Policy. It is one of the villages represented within the Sha Tau Kok District Rural Committee. For electoral purposes, Shek Kiu Tau is part of the Sha Ta constituency, which is currently represented by Ko Wai-kei.

History
At the time of the 1911 census, the population of Shek Kiu Tau was 98. The number of males was 37.

See also
 Shek Chung Au

References

External links
 Delineation of area of existing village Shek Kiu Tau (Sha Tau Kok) for election of resident representative (2019 to 2022)

Villages in North District, Hong Kong
Sha Tau Kok